Baisha is a town of Yangshuo County, Guangxi, China. , it has one residential community and 15 villages under its administration.

References

Towns of Guilin
Yangshuo County